The Envalira Tunnel is a tunnel in Andorra that runs between Pas de la Casa near the Andorra-France border and Grau Roig (Ski resort). It enables its users to avoid the Envalira Pass. It is amongst the highest road tunnels in Europe.

Although situated within the borders of Andorra, the entrance at Pas de la Casa can only be reached via a bridge that is situated in France. The Andorra/France border post is therefore situated 2 km within France, northeast of the access bridge, on RN22. On the French side it is connected to RN22, and on the Andorran side to the CGII.

Plans for a tunnel were developed in Andorra during the late 1950s. In 1963, the Envalira Tunnel design tender was awarded to French engineers Semet and Phillip Studies, and subsequent negotiations were conducted for years and the access roads were improved. On June 1, 1999, Spanish companies FCC and NECSO (today ACCIONA) began construction work on the Grau Roig side of the massif; and on August 2, 1999, work began on the Pas de la Casa side.

Operator & concession
The Tunnel is operated by Net de Gerrers, an alternative asset manager with headquarters in Valencia, Spain, as a toll tunnel. The concession period is for 50 years. The construction cost was 11 Bn Pesetas (approx. 80 Million Euros).

References

Tunnels in Andorra
Encamp
Toll tunnels in Europe
Road tunnels
Andorra–France border crossings